Ischyroceridae is a family of amphipods. It contains the following genera:
Ambicholestes Just, 1998
Bonnierella Chevreux, 1900
Cerapus Say, 1817
Ericthonius Milne-Edwards, 1830
Ischyrocerus Krøyer, 1838
Jassa Leach, 1814
Microjassa Stebbing, 1899
Neoischyrocerus Conlan, 1995
Parajassa Stebbing, 1899
Siphonoecetes Krøyer, 1845
Ventojassa J. L. Barnard, 1970

References

Corophiidea
Taxa named by Thomas Roscoe Rede Stebbing
Crustacean families